Sei still, wisse ICH BIN (subtitled "Szenische Gesänge") is the thirteenth album by Popol Vuh. It was originally released in 1981 on Klaus Schulze's record label Innovative Communication. In 2006 SPV re-released the album with one bonus track. "Wehe Khorazin", "Garten der Gemeinschaft", an extract of "Laß los" and "... als lebten die Engel auf Erden" were used in 1982 for the soundtrack of Werner Herzog's film Fitzcarraldo.

Track listing 
All tracks composed by Florian Fricke.

 "Wehe Khorazin" – 6:22
 "Und als ER sah es geht dem Ende zu" – 7:04
 "Garten der Gemeinschaft" – 4:41
 "Gemeinsam aßen sie das Brot" – 2:51
 "Laß los" – 6:46
 "Gemeinsam tranken sie den Wein" – 3:50
 "...als lebten die Engel auf Erden" – 2:10

2006 bonus track
 "King Minos III" (Studio Version) – 5:02

Personnel 
 Florian Fricke – piano, vocals
 Daniel Fichelscher – guitar, drums
 Renate Knaup – vocals

Guest musicians
 Chris Karrer – soprano saxophone
 Choir ensemble of the Bavarian State Opera

Credits 
Recorded at Bavaria Studio, Munich, 1981 
Produced by Florian Fricke and IC – Klaus Schulze Productions 
Track number 8 produced by Florian Fricke

Cover photography by Thomas Lindner

References

External links 

http://www.furious.com/perfect/populvuh.html (Comprehensive article & review of every album, in English)
https://web.archive.org/web/20080119183122/http://www.enricobassi.it/popvuhdiscografia80.htm (featuring the original credits)
http://www.venco.com.pl/~acrux/seistill.htm

Popol Vuh (band) albums
1981 albums